Avalon Books (originally Bouregy & Curl) was a small New York-based book publishing imprint active from 1950 through 2012, established by Thomas Bouregy. Avalon was an important science fiction imprint in the 1950s and 60s; later its specialty was mystery and romance books. The imprint was owned by Thomas Bouregy & Co., Inc.  

On June 4, 2012 it was announced that Amazon.com had purchased the imprint and its back-list of about 3,000 titles. Amazon said it would publish the books through the various imprints of Amazon Publishing.

Science fiction era
In the 1950s and 60s Avalon specialized in science fiction. It issued hardcover material in the genre during the period, particularly in the earlier portion. Avalon issued new titles, reissued out of print titles originally from other publishers, and first editions of material that had previously only seen magazine publication. Frederik Pohl jibed in 1959 that the publisher "seems to be pursuing a policy of printing the worst books by the best writers in science fiction". Its books featured cover art by Ric Binkley, Ed Emshwiller (also known as Emsh), Gray Morrow, and Michael M. Peters. Later, competition with mainstream hardcover and paperback publishers starting their own science fiction lines and the marginal nature of genre publishing in general led to the line being discontinued.

Science fiction authors published by Avalon

 Poul Anderson
 E. L. Arch
 Bruce Ariss
 Manly Banister
 Eando Binder
 James Blish
 J. Harvey Bond
 Lin Carter
 Curtis W. Casewit
 A. Bertram Chandler
 Adam Chase
 Stanton A. Coblentz
 Hunt Collins
 Ray Cummings
 L. Sprague de Camp
 Lester del Rey
 Diane Detzer
 George Allan England
 Oscar J. Friend
 J. U. Giesy

 David Grinnell
 J. Hunter Holly
 Raymond F. Jones
 Ivar Jorgenson
 Joseph E. Kelleam
 Otis Adelbert Kline
 Murray Leinster
 Erik Van Lhin
 Charles R. Long
 Frank Belknap Long
 Robert W. Lowndes
 Adam Lukens
 Fred MacIsaac
 Charles Eric Maine
 S. P. Meek
 Philip Francis Nowlan
 David Osborne
 Rog Phillips
 Fletcher Pratt

 Jorge de Reyna
 Eric Frank Russell
 Robert Sheckley
 Lee Sheldon
 Robert Silverberg
 Evelyn E. Smith
 George Henry Smith
 George O. Smith
 Francis Stevens
 Charles B. Stilson
 Leslie F. Stone
 Jeff Sutton
 E. C. Tubb
 Jack Vance
 Roger Lee Vernon
 Manly Wade Wellman
 Wallace West
 Robert Moore Williams
 Russ Winterbotham

Bibliography of Science Fiction books published (by year)
1953 (Bourgey/Curl)
Flight Into Yesterday (Charles L. Harness)
Sentinels From Space (Eric Frank Russell)

1956
Police Your Planet (Erik Van Lhin)
Star Ways (Poul Anderson)
The Secret People (Raymond F. Jones)
Three to Conquer (Eric Frank Russell)
Tomorrow's World (Hunt Collins)

1957
Across Time (David Grinnell)
Alien Dust (E. C. Tubb)
Big Planet (Jack Vance)
City on the Moon (Murray Leinster)
Conquest of Earth (Manly Banister)
Hidden World (Stanton A. Coblentz)
Solomon's Stone (L. Sprague de Camp)
The Infinite Brain (Charles R. Long)
Troubled Star (George O. Smith)
Twice in Time (Manly Wade Wellman)
Wasp (Eric Frank Russell)

1958
Aliens From Space (David Osborne)
Edge of Time (David Grinnell)
Fire in the Heavens (George O. Smith)
Immortality Delivered (Robert Sheckley)
Invisible Barriers (David Osborne)
Out of This World (Murray Leinster)
Spaceways Satellite (Charles Eric Maine)
Starhaven (Ivar Jorgenson)
The Blue Barbarians (Stanton A. Coblentz)
The Languages of Pao (Jack Vance)
The Space Egg (Russ Winterbotham)
The Tower of Zanid (L. Sprague de Camp)

1959
Day of the Giants (Lester del Rey)
Encounter (J. Hunter Holly)
Giants from Eternity (Manly Wade Wellman)
Lost in Space (George O. Smith)
Robot Hunt (Roger Lee Vernon)
The Dark Destroyers (Manly Wade Wellman)
The Duplicated Man (James Blish) and (Robert Lowndes)
The Golden Ape (Adam Chase)
The Involuntary Immortals (Rog Phillips)
The Martian Missile (David Grinnell)
The Sea People (Adam Lukens)
Virgin Planet (Poul Anderson)

1960
Conquest of Life (Adam Lukens)
He Owned the World (Charles Eric Maine)
Hunters of Space (Joseph E. Kelleam)
Invaders from Rigel (Fletcher Pratt)
Lords of Atlantis (Wallace West)
Next Door to the Sun (Stanton A. Coblentz)
The Glory That Was (L. Sprague de Camp)
The Little Men (Joseph E. Kelleam)
The Peacemakers (Curtis W. Casewit)
The Swordsman of Mars (Otis Adelbert Kline)
Wall of Serpents (L. Sprague de Camp) and (Fletcher Pratt)

1961
Believers' World (Robert W. Lowndes)
Collision Course (Robert Silverberg)
Destiny's Orbit (David Grinnell)
Island in the Sky (Manly Wade Wellman)
Planet of Peril (Otis Adelbert Kline)
Sons of the Wolf (Adam Lukens)
The Drums of Tapajos (Colonel S. P. Meek)
The Memory Bank (Wallace West)
The Outlaws of Mars (Otis Adelbert Kline)
The Rim of Space (A. Bertram Chandler)
The Runaway World (Stanton A. Coblentz)
Troyana (Colonel S. P. Meek)

1962
Alien Planet (Fletcher Pratt)
Armageddon 2419 A.D. (Philip Francis Nowlan)
Outposts in Space (Wallace West)
Prince of Peril (Otis Adelbert Kline)
Tam, Son of the Tiger (Otis Adelbert Kline)
The Dark Planet (J. Hunter Holly)
The Glass Cage (Adam Lukens)
The Perfect Planet (Evelyn E. Smith)
The Search for Zei (L. Sprague de Camp)
The World Within (Adam Lukens)
Walk Up the Sky (Robert Moore Williams)

1963
Alien World (Adam Lukens)
Bridge to Yesterday (E. L. Arch)
Eevalu (Adam Lukens)
Full Circle (Bruce Ariss)
River of Time (Wallace West)
The Atom Conspiracy (Jeff Sutton)
The Gray Aliens (Joan Hunter Holly)
The Hand of Zei (L. Sprague de Camp)
The Men from Arcturus (Russ Winterbotham)
The Star Men (Oscar J. Friend)
Three Steps Spaceward (Frank B. Long)

1964
Glory Planet (A. Bertram Chandler)
Mission to a Star (Frank Belknap Long)
Planet of Death (E. L. Arch)
The Deathstones (E. L. Arch)
The Eternal Man (Charles R. Long)
The Exile of Time (Ray Cummings)
The Lizard Lords (Stanton A. Coblentz)
The Martian Visitors (Frank B. Long)
The Moon People (Stanton A. Coblentz)
The Puppet Planet (Russ Winterbotham)
Time Lockers (Wallace West)

1965
Beyond the Great Oblivion (George Allan England)
Darkness and Dawn (George Allan England)
Enslaved Brains (Eando Binder)
Explorers Into Infinity (Ray Cummings)
Palos of the Dog Star Pack (J. U. Giesy)
Polaris of the Snows (Charles B. Stilson)
The Dark Enemy (J. Hunter Holly)
The First Immortals (E. L. Arch)
The Forgotten Planet (George Henry Smith)
The Hothouse World (Fred MacIsaac)
The Mouthpiece of Zitu (J. U. Giesy)

1966
Claimed (Francis Stevens)Jason, Son of Jason (J. U. Giesy)Lord of Tranerica (Stanton A. Coblentz)Minos of Sardanes (Charles Stilson)The Double-Minded Man (E. L. Arch)The Lord of Nardos (Russ Winterbotham)The Mind Traders (J. Hunter Holly)The People of the Abyss (George Allan England)The Time Chariot (T. Earl Hickey)When the Red King Woke (Joseph E. Kelleam)

1967Destination: Saturn (Lin Carter) and (David Grinnell)Doomed Planet (Lee Sheldon)Druids' World (George Henry Smith)Out of the Abyss (George Allan England)Out of the Void (Leslie F. Stone)The Afterglow (George Allan England)The Crimson Capsule (Stanton A. Coblentz)The Everlasting Exiles (Wallace West)The Insect Invasion (Ray Cummings)The Man With Three Eyes (E. L. Arch)

1968Planet of Fear (Diane Detzer)Polaris and the Immortals (Charles B. Stilson)The Day the World Stopped (Stanton A. Coblentz)The Return of the Starships (Jorge de Reyna)The Stars Will Wait (Henry L. Hasse)The Time of the Hedrons'' (Jack Dennis)

Mystery and Romance era
After the discontinuation of its science fiction line, Avalon specialized in mystery and romance books.

Romance Authors published by Avalon Books

 Alayne Adams
 Lois Carnell Alexander
 Joye Ames
 Jessica Andersen
 Wendy May Andrews
 Gina Ardito
 Heidi Ashworth
 Kat Attalla
 Janet Avery
 Susan Aylworth
 Patricia K. Azeltine
 Zelda Benjamin
 Alison Blake
 Amy Blizzard
 Beate Boeker
 Rebecca L. Boschee
 Loretta Brabant
 Sandra D. Bricker
 Carolyn Brown
 Mark Sydney Burk
 Ludima Gus Burton
 Christine Bush
 Kaye Calkins
 Carolann Camillo
 Carolynn Carey
 Kathy Carmichael
 Margaret Carroll
 Nell Carson
 Sheila Claydon
 Gena Cline
 Karen Cogan
 Janet Cookson
 Annette Couch-Jareb
 Tami Cowden
 Connie Cox
 Jillian Dagg
 Sandra Dark
 Patricia DeGroot
 Roni Denholtz
 Sierra Donovan
 Laurie Alice Eakes
 Glen Ebisch
 Sandra Elzie
 Rachel Evans 
 Wilma Fasano
 Sherry Lynn Ferguson
 Shellie Foltz
 Karen Frisch
 Kathleen Fuller
 Mike Gaherty
 Shelly Galloway
 Darlene Gardner
 Carol Blake Gerrond
 Sue Gibson
 Theresa Goldstrand
 Jean C. Gordon
 Lacey Green
 Sandi Haddad
 Mary Hagen
 Peggy Hansen
 Cheryl Cooke Harrington

 Amanda Harte
 Pat Hines
 Carolyn Hughey
 Phyllis Humphrey
 Carol Hutchens
 Mona Ingram 
 Holly Jacobs
 Jenny Jacobs
 Noelene Jenkinson
 Cheri Jetton
 Victoria M. Johnson
 Janet Kaderli
 Veronica Kegel-Coon
 Judy Kouzel
 Linda Lattimer
 Mary Leask
 Georgie Lee
 Sheryl Leonard
 Sarita Leone
 Ann LeValley
 Cathy Liggett
 Sandra Livingston
 Kimberly Llewellyn
 CJ Love
 Judith Lown
 Tracey J. Lyons
 Gail MacMillan
 Annette Mahon
 Shirley Marks
 Blanche Marriott
 Beverly Martin-Lowry and Sue Boltz
 Ellen Gray Massey
 Carolyn Matkowsky
 Debby Mayne
 Ilsa Mayr
 Jane McBride Choate
 Elizabeth McBride
 Cathy McDavid
 Terry Zahniser McDermid
 Shelagh McEachern
 Kate McKeever
 Jilliene McKinstry
 Fran McNabb
 Nicola Merrells
 Barbara Meyers
 Kathleen Mix
 Lisa Mondello
 Nancy Morgan
 Jean Ann Moynahan
 Rosemarie Naramore
 Deborah Nolan
 Anne Norman
 Kim O'Brien
 Rebecca K. O'Connor
 Holly O'Dell
 Gerry O'Hara
 Dorothy P. O'Neill
 Robin O'Neill
 Linda L. Paisley
 Nancy J. Parra

 Alba Marie Pastorek
 Jane Myers Perrine
 Nikki Poppen
 Marilyn Prather
 Gaby Pratt
 Bernadette Pruitt
 Kathryn Quick
 Susan Ralph
 Tara Randel
 Carol Reddick
 Shirley Raye Redmond
 Heather Reed
 Sylvia Renfro
 Sarah Richmond
 Sheila Robins
 Jeanne Robinson
 Betsy Rogers
 Elizabeth Rose
 Jocelyn Saint James
 JoAnn Sands
 Lois Schwartz
 Cynthia Scott
 Stephanie Scott
 Bev Sexton
 Fran Shaff
 Marilyn Shank
 Elaine Shelabarger
 Deborah Shelley
 Mary Sheppard
 Victoria Sheringham
 Jennifer Shirk
 Nadia Shworan
 DeAnn Smallwood
 Jeanette Sparks
 Helen Spears
 Constance Sprague
 Angie Stanton
 Christina Starr
 Hazel Statham
 Julie Stone
 Norma Davis Stoyenoff
 Marlene Stringer
 Eva Swain
 Teresa Swift
 Mary Anne Taylor
 Judi Thoman
 Katrina Thomas
 Liz Thompson
 Lynn M. Turner
 Edna Van Leuven
 Joselyn Vaughn
 Joan Vincent
 Sydell Voeller
 Suzanne Walter
 Kim Watters
 Heather S. Webber
 Jan Weeks
 Sandra Wilkins
 Frances Engle Wilson
 Helen Wingo
 Donna Wright

References

1950 establishments in New York City
2012 disestablishments in New York (state)
Amazon (company) acquisitions
Defunct book publishing companies of the United States